Darko Franović (born 2 October 1967) is a former Croatian handball player who competed in the 1994 European Men's Handball Championship in Portugal.

Orders
Order of Danica Hrvatska with face of Franjo Bučar - 1995

External links
Eurohandball profile

References

Croatian male handball players
RK Crikvenica players
RK Zamet players
Yugoslav male handball players
Handball players from Rijeka
1967 births
Living people